Graham Donaldson (20 June 1935 – 31 August 2001) was an Australian rules footballer in the Victorian Football League.

Donaldson made his debut for the Carlton Football Club in the Round 4 of the 1955 season. He announced his retirement from the game after the 1962 season.

External links

Graham Donaldson, Blueseum

1935 births
2001 deaths
Carlton Football Club players
Fitzroy Football Club coaches
East Ballarat Football Club players
Australian rules footballers from Victoria (Australia)